Chrysodeixis acuta, the tunbridge wells gem, is a moth of the family Noctuidae. It is found in Africa as well as the on Canary Islands eastwards to Australasia Indonesia and Oceania.

The wingspan is 35–45 mm.

The larvae feed on various plants, including barley, linseed and sorghum.

References

External links
 Lepiforum.de

Plusiinae
Moths described in 1858
Moths of Asia
Moths of Cape Verde
Moths of Japan
Moths of the Middle East
Owlet moths of Africa
Owlet moths of Europe
Taxa named by Francis Walker (entomologist)